Andreas Suttner (September 25, 1876 – July 5, 1953) was an Austrian fencer who competed in the 1912 Summer Olympics.

He was part of the Austrian sabre team, which won the silver medal. In the individual foil event, he was eliminated during the first round.

References

External links
Profile

1876 births
1953 deaths
Austrian male fencers
Austrian foil fencers
Austrian sabre fencers
Olympic fencers of Austria
Fencers at the 1912 Summer Olympics
Olympic silver medalists for Austria
Olympic medalists in fencing
Medalists at the 1912 Summer Olympics
Sportspeople from the Austro-Hungarian Empire